Obârșia de Câmp is a commune located in Mehedinți County, Oltenia, Romania. It is composed of two villages, Izimșa and Obârșia de Câmp.

References

Communes in Mehedinți County
Localities in Oltenia